The Crimean Socialist Soviet Republic ( or Крымская Советская Социалистическая Республика) or the Soviet Socialist Republic of the Crimea was a state allied with Soviet Russia that existed in Crimea for several months in 1919 during the Russian Civil War.  It was the second Bolshevik government in Crimea and its capital was Simferopol.

Description
In April 1919, the Bolsheviks invaded Crimea for the second time (the first was in March 1918 and led to the creation of the short-lived Taurida Soviet Socialist Republic).  After the conquest of Crimea (with the exception of the Kerch Peninsula) by the 3rd Ukrainian Red Army, a Crimean Regional Party Conference at Simferopol from 28–29 April adopted a resolution forming the Crimean Soviet Socialist Republic and a revolutionary committee government.

By 30 April, the Bolsheviks had occupied the entire peninsula and, on 5 May, the government was formed with Dmitry Ilyich Ulyanov, Vladimir Lenin's brother, as chairman.  On 1 June, the Crimean SSR joined in military union with soviet republics in Russia, Ukraine, Belorussia, Lithuania, and Latvia.

The republic was declared to be a non-national entity based on the equality of all nationalities.  Nationalization of industry and confiscation of the land of landlords, kulaks, and the church were implemented.  The Crimean SSR was more friendly toward the interests of Crimean Tatars than the Taurida SSR had been and leftist Tatars were allowed to take positions in the government.

Starting in late May, Anton Denikin's White Volunteer Army, which had been gaining strength, threatened seizure of Crimea.  On 18 June, White forces under Yakov Slashchov (Яков Слащёв) landed in the area Koktebel and, as a result, the authorities of the Crimean SSR were evacuated from Crimea from 23–26 June and the Whites assumed control of the peninsula. Crimea did not have its own government again until the formation of the South Russian Government by the Whites in February 1920.

Soviet government
 Chairman of council - Dmitry Ulyanov
 Narkom of Army and Navy - Pavel Dybenko, commander of the Crimean Red Army
 Narkom of Propaganda and Agitation - Alexandra Kollontai
 Narkom of Health Care - Dmitry Ulyanov
 Narkom of People's Enlightenment - Ivan Nazukin
 Narkom of Justice - I.Ibrahimov
 Narkom of Land Cultivation - S. Idrisov
 Narkom of Foreign Affairs - S. Memetov

References

See also
History of Crimea
Russian Civil War
Post-Russian Empire states

Russian Revolution in Ukraine
Russian-speaking countries and territories
States and territories disestablished in 1919
Post–Russian Empire states
Early Soviet republics
Former unrecognized countries
States and territories established in 1919
Communism in Ukraine
Crimea during the Russian Civil War
Former socialist republics
Political history of Crimea